The 2010 Boys' Youth Olympic Volleyball Tournament was the 1st edition of the event, organized by the world's governing body, the FIVB in conjunction with the IOC. It was held in Singapore from 21 to 26 August 2010.

Pools composition

Venue
 Toa Payoh Sports Hall, Singapore

Preliminary round
All times are Singapore Standard Time (UTC+08:00).

Pool A

|}

|}

Pool B

|}

|}

Final round
All times are Singapore Standard Time (UTC+08:00).

5th–6th places

5th place match

|}

Championship

Semifinals

|}

Bronze medal match

|}

Gold medal match

|}

Final standing

Medalists

External links
Official website

Volleyball at the 2010 Summer Youth Olympics